Hasnain Shah (born 16 October 1992) is a Pakistani cricketer. He made his first-class debut for Water and Power Development Authority in the 2017–18 Quaid-e-Azam Trophy on 26 September 2017. He made his List A debut for Water and Power Development Authority in the 2017–18 Departmental One Day Cup on 28 December 2017.

References

External links
 

1992 births
Living people
Pakistani cricketers
Place of birth missing (living people)
Water and Power Development Authority cricketers